Divyansha Kaushik is an Indian actress who primarily works in Telugu films. She made her acting debut with the Telugu film Majili (2019), for which she received SIIMA Award for Best Female Debut – Telugu nomination. She made her Hindi film debut with The Wife (2021).

Early life
Kaushik was born and brought up in Delhi. Her mother, Anju Kaushik, is an established make-up artiste in Bollywood, who has mostly worked with Rani Mukerji. She worked as an intern with Yash Raj Films.

Career
Kaushik made her acting debut in 2019 with the Telugu film Majili opposite Naga Chaitanya. It became a box-office success. Firstpost noted, "Divyansha Kaushik is a terrific new talent and she is the big surprise package of Majili." 

She then made her Hindi film debut with The Wife in 2021. The film received mostly mixed reviews from critics and released on ZEE5.

She portrayed the lead opposite Ravi Teja in the 2022 Telugu film Ramarao on Duty. The News Minute stated "Divyanksha is not given a substantial role. She is merely like a junior artist and seems miscast". It became a box-office failure.

Kaushik next appeared in the 2023 film Michael opposite Sundeep Kishan. 

Kaushik has Sudheer Varma's next Telugu film opposite Nikhil Siddharth and the long delayed Tamil film Takkar opposite Siddharth in her kitty.

Filmography

Films

Awards and nominations

References

External links
 

Indian film actresses
Actresses in Telugu cinema
Actresses in Hindi cinema
Actresses from Delhi
21st-century Indian actresses
Year of birth missing (living people)
Living people